I'm a Monkey's Uncle is a 1948 short subject directed by Jules White starring American slapstick comedy team The Three Stooges (Moe Howard, Larry Fine and Shemp Howard). It is the 110th entry in the series released by Columbia Pictures starring the comedians, who released 190 shorts for the studio between 1934 and 1959.

Plot
The Stooges are cavemen living in the Stone Age. They must tend to their daily chores, consisting of mixing milk from a cow, hunting fish, and gathering eggs. Such is life in the prehistoric times. That afternoon, Moe has a date with his girlfriend, Aggie (Virginia Hunter). Shemp and Larry want to join, as Aggie has two sisters for the boys, Maggie (Nancy Saunders) and Baggie (Dee Green). When rival cavemen allege that the Stooges stole their women, a fight breaks out, with the trio catapulting rocks, mud and eggs at the cavemen. After fending them off, the victorious Stooges are free to woo their sweethearts.

Production notes
I'm a Monkey's Uncle was filmed on July 28–31, 1947; it was remade as Stone Age Romeos in 1955. The film title references the idiom "monkey's uncle".

This is one of the few films in which Shemp imitates brother Curly Howard's barking routine. This was done in other films like Who Done It?, due to certain scripts being written for Curly before his untimely illness.

References

External links 
 
 

1948 films
1948 comedy films
1948 short films
The Three Stooges films
American black-and-white films
Films about cavemen
Films directed by Jules White
Columbia Pictures short films
American comedy short films
1940s English-language films
1940s American films